List of administrative division codes of the PRC in Division 2 or Northeast China.

Liaoning (21)

Jilin (22)

Heilongjiang (23)

China geography-related lists